This is a list of the serving generals (major generals, lieutenant generals and full generals) of the Bangladesh Army.

Currently, the army has 1 full general, 6 lieutenant generals and 53 major generals.

Current Bangladesh Army generals
 General 
 General  SM Shafiuddin Ahmed - Chief of Army Staff (CAS), Army Headquarters, Dhaka Cantonment (Colonel of the Regiment –The East Bengal Regiment,  Bangladesh Infantry Regiment & regiment of Artillery & also Colonel Commandant - Corps of Military Police, Corps of Engineers, Signals Corps & Armoured Corps) - 9th BMA Long Course, Infantry.
 Lieutenant Generals 
 Lieutenant General Ataul Hakim Sarwar Hasan  – Chief of the General Staff (CGS), Army Headquarters, Dhaka Cantonment - 11th BMA Long Course, Infantry.
 Lieutenant General S M Matiur Rahman – Ambassador, Ministry of Foreign Affairs (MoFA) - 13th BMA Long Course, Infantry.
 Lieutenant General Waker-uz-Zaman  - Principal Staff Officer, Armed Forces Division (PSO AFD), Prime Minister's Office - 13th BMA Long Course, Infantry .
 Lieutenant General Akbar Hossain - Commandant, National Defence College (NDC), Mirpur Cantonment - 13th BMA Long Course  Artillery.
 Lieutenant General Md Saiful Alam - Quartermaster-General (QMG), Army Headquarters, Dhaka Cantonment - 14th BMA Long Course, Infantry.
 Lieutenant General Ahmed Tabrez Shams Chowdhury - General Officer Commanding, Army Training & Doctrine Command (GOC, ARTDOC) - 16th BMA Long Course, Infantry.
 Major Generals 
 Major General Jahangir Al Mustahidur Rahman  - Ambassador, Embassy of People's Republic of Bangladesh, Lebanon - 15th BMA Long Course (also Colonel Commandant – Army Service Corps), Army Service Corps.
 Major General Sultanuzzaman Md Saleh Uddin – Managing Director, Bangladesh Machine Tools Factory Limited (MD BMTF), Gazipur- 15th BMA Long Course, Engineers.
 Major General Sheikh Pasha Habib Uddin - Director General, Institute Of International and Strategic Studies (DG BIISS) - 16th BMA Long Course, Artillery.
 Major General T M Jobaer - Director General, National Security Intelligence (DG NSI) - 16th BMA Long Course, Artillery.
  Major General SM Salahuddin Islam - Military Secretary to the President of Bangladesh (MSP), Bangabhaban - 17th BMA Long Course, Infantry.
  Major General Mohammad Main Ullah Chowdhury - Deputy Force Commander, MINURSO, Western Sahara - 17th BMA Long Course, Infantry.
  Major General Mizanur Rahman Shamim - General Officer Commanding (GOC) 24th Infantry Division, Chattogram Cantonment & Area Commander, Chattogram Area- 17th BMA Long Course. Infantry.
  Major General Nazrul Islam - Adjutant General (AG), Army Headquarters, Dhaka Cantonment - 17th BMA Long Course, Artillery.
  Major General Shakil Ahmed - General Officer Commanding (GOC), 66th Infantry Division & Area Commander, Rangpur Area- 18th BMA Long Course, Infantry
  Major General A K M Nazmul Hasan – Director General, Border Guard Bangladesh (DG BGB)  - 18th BMA Long Course, Infantry.
  Major General Mojibur Rahman - Director General, Special Security Force (DG SSF), Prime Minister's Office - 18th BMA Long Course, Infantry.
  Major General Ashiq-uz-Zaman - Ambassador, Embassy of People's Republic of Bangladesh, Kuwait - 18th BMA Long Course, Artillery.
  Major General Naqib Ahmed Chowdhury- General Officer Commanding (GOC) 19th Infantry Division & Area Commander, Ghatail Area- 19th BMA Long Course, Infantry.
  Major General Mohammed Jubayer Salehin – Engineer-in-Chief (E-in-C), Army Headquarters, Dhaka Cantonment - 19th BMA Long Course, Engineers.
  Major General Md. Zahirul Islam – Master General of Ordnance (MGO), Army Headquarters, Dhaka Cantonment. - 19th BMA Long Course, Infantry.
 Major General Fakhrul Ahsan  – General Officer Commanding (GOC) 10th Infantry Division, Ramu Cantonment & Area Commander, Cox's Bazar Area  - 19th BMA Long Course, Infantry.
  Major General Abul Hasnat Md Khairul Bashar - Ambassador, Ministry of Foreign Affairs (Bangladesh) (MoFA) - 20th BMA Long Course, Infantry.
  Major General Abul Kalam Mohammad Ziaur Rahman – Executive Chairman, Bangladesh Export Processing Zones Authority (Bepza) 20th BMA Long Course, Artillery.
 Major General Shaheenul Haque – General Officer Commanding (GOC) 9th Infantry Division, Savar Cantonment & Area Commander, Savar Area - 20th BMA Long Course, Infantry.
 Major General Sayed Tareq Hussain – Senior Directing Staff (Army) National Defence College (SDS Army, NDC), Mirpur Cantonment - 21st BMA Long Course, Infantry.
 Major General SM Kamrul Hassan – Commandant, Bangladesh Military Academy (Commandant BMA), Bhatiary, Chittagong- 21st BMA Long Course, Infantry.
 Major General AKM Aminul Haque - Director General, Bangladesh Ansar & Village Defense Party (DG Ansar & VDP) - 21st BMA Long Course, Signals.
  Major General Md. Khaled Al Mamun - General Officer Commanding (GOC), 11th Infantry Division & Area Commander, Bogra Area- 21st BMA Long Course, Artillery.
  Major General Md. Ashraful Islam- Chairman, Bangladesh Tea Board, Nasirabad, Chattagram - 21st BMA Long Course, Engineers.
  Major General Md. Saidul Islam- RCDS Course Member, Royal College of Defence Studies (RCDS), London, United Kingdom. - 21st BMA Long Course, Engineers.
  Major General Hamidul Haque- Director General, Directorate-General of Forces Intelligence (DG DGFI) - 22nd BMA Long Course, Infantry.
  Major General Abdul Qayoom Mollah – General Officer Commanding (GOC) 7th Infantry Division, Sheikh Hasina cantonment & Area Commander, Barishal Area - 22nd BMA Long Course, Infantry.
 Major General Chowdhury Mohammad Azizul Haque Hazary - General Officer Commanding (GOC) 17th Infantry Division, Jalalabad Cantonment & Area Commander, Sylhet Area -  22nd BMA Long Course, Infantry.
  Major General Md. Nurul Anwar – Director General, Department of Immigration & Passports (DG DIP), Ministry of Home Affairs, Dhaka - 22nd BMA Long Course, Artillery.
  Major General Khan Firoz Ahmed – Military Secretary (MS), Army Headquarters, Dhaka Cantonment - 23rd BMA Long Course, Infantry.
 Major General Md. Faizur Rahman –  Commandant, Defence Services Command and Staff College (Commandant DSCSC), Mirpur Cantonment - 23rd BMA Long Course, Infantry.
 Major General  A S M Ridwanur Rahman – Commandant, Bangladesh Institute of Peace Support Operation Training (BIPSOT), Rajendrapur Cantonment, Rajendrapur, Gazipur - 23rd BMA Long Course, Artillery.
  Major General IKM Mostahsenul Baki – Group Commander, Army Aviation Group - 23rd BMA Long Course, Artillery.
  Major General Md Mahbub-ul Alam – Vice Chancellor, Bangladesh University of Professionals (VC BUP), Mirpur Cantonment, Dhaka - 23rd BMA Long Course, Infantry.
  Major General Iftekhar Anis– Chairman, Sena Kalyan Sangstha (SKS) - 23rd BMA Long Course, Engineers.
  Major General Md Mostagousur Rahman Khan - Senior Directing Staff-2 (Army) National Defence College (SDS Army-2, NDC), Mirpur Cantonment- 23rd BMA Long Course, Infantry.
  Major General Md Mainur Rahman – General Officer Commanding (GOC) 33rd Infantry Division & Area Commander, Cumilla Area - 24th BMA Long Course, Infantry.
 Major General Kabir Ahmed – Military Secretary to Prime Minister (MSPM), Prime Minister's Office, Tejgaon, Dhaka. - 24th BMA Long Course, Infantry.
 Major General Ziaul Ahsan – Director General, National Telecommunication Monitoring Centre (DG NTMC), Dhaka. - 24th BMA Long Course, Infantry.
  Major General Md. Mahbubur Rashid – General Officer Commanding (GOC) 55th Infantry Division & Area Commander, Jashore Area, Jashore District - 24th BMA Long Course, Infantry.
 Major General A K M Rezaul Mazid – Chief Consultant General (CCG), Adhoc Construction Supervision Consultant (CSC), Bangladesh Army & Chief Coordinator (CCO), Padma Bridge Rail Link Project (PBRLP) & Padma Multipurpose Bridge Project (Engg Support & Safety Team) (PMBP (ESST))  - 24th BMA Long Course, Engineers.
 Major General Mir Mushfiqur Rahman – Director General, Directorate-General of Defence Purchase (DG DGDP), Dhaka - 24th BMA Long Course, Infantry.
 Major General Md Maksudul Haque – (Commandant BOF), Bangladesh Ordnance Factories, Gazipur - 24th BMA Long Course, Ordnance.
 Major General Sheikh Mohammad Sarwar Hossain – Commandant, School of Infantry and Tactics (Commandant SI&T), Jalalabad Cantonment, Sylhet - 25th BMA Long Course, Infantry.
  Major General Dr. Musa Khan– Director General, Directorate General Medical Service (DG DGMS), Dhaka Cantonment (also Colonel Commandant – Army Medical Corps) AMC, Army Medical Corps.
  Major General Dr. Md. Azizul Islam – Consultant Physician General, Directorate General of Medical Services (CPG DGMS), Dhaka Cantonment AMC, Army Medical Corps.
 Major General Anisur Rahman Howlader – Consultant Surgeon General, Directorate General of Medical Services (CSG DGMS), Dhaka Cantonment AMC, Army Medical Corps.
  Major General Dr. AKM Mustafa Kamal Pasha – Commandant, Armed Forces Medical College (AFMC), Dhaka Cantonment AMC, Army Medical Corps.
  Major General Mohammad Yousuf– Director General, Directorate General Drug Administration (DG DGDA), Dhaka  AMC, Army Medical Corps.
  Major General Dr. Nishat Jubaida – Commandant, Armed Forces Institute of Pathology (AFIP), Dhaka Cantonment AMC, Army Medical Corps
  Vacant - Area Commander, Logistics Area, Dhaka Cantonment
 Vacant - Dental Surgeon General, Directorate General of Medical Services (DSG DGMS), Dhaka Cantonment
 Vacant - Commandant, Military Institute of Science and Technology (Commandant MIST), Mirpur Cantonment, Dhaka -

Note
Generals holding appointments of the army headquarters have been written in bold format (e.g. Master General of Ordnance - MGO); appointments of General Officer Commandings (GOCs)/all other important appointments held by generals have been written in bold format and also Army Medical Corps has been written in bold format.

See also
 List of serving admirals of the Bangladesh Navy
 List of serving air marshals of the Bangladesh Air Force

References

 
Bangladesh military-related lists
Bangladesh Army
Bangladesh Army